The River Ribble runs through North Yorkshire and Lancashire in Northern England. It starts close to the Ribblehead Viaduct in North Yorkshire, and is one of the few that start in the Yorkshire Dales and flow westwards towards the Irish Sea (the Dee in Dentdale and the Twiss in Kingsdale being notable others).

Etymology
The name Ribble may be a Brittonic compound-formation. The second element is the noun *pol, with connotations including "puddle, pond, upland-stream" (Welsh pwll). The first is rö-, an intensive prefix, with nouns meaning "great" (Welsh rhy-, Cornish re-).

Ribble may once have been known as *Bremetonā-, underlying the name Bremetenacum, the Roman fort at Ribchester. Involved here is the Brittonic root *breμ–, meaning "roaring" (c.f. Welsh brefu), as observed at the river-names Breamish in Northumberland, Braan in Scotland and Brefi in Wales.

History
Neolithic to Saxon finds from along the River Ribble during the creation of the Preston Docks and others revealed man has been in the area for a long time. The River Ribble looked completely different then and the coastline is likely to have been much further inland than it is at present where land has been reclaimed and the marsh extended out into the River Ribble due to sedimentation.

The Ribble would appear to have been known in Roman times as the Belisama, possibly giving its name to Samlesbury. Ptolemy's "Belisama aest." seems to represent the estuary of the Ribble. Bremetennacum was a Roman fort that guarded a crossing-point of the river at Ribchester. Remains of another Roman site were discovered at Walton-le-Dale in the mid-19th century.

The medieval silver Mitton Hoard was found near where this river joins the River Hodder in 2009. Whilst the Cuerdale Hoard, the largest Viking silver hoard ever found outside Russia was discovered in 1840 on the southern bank of a bend of the river, at Cuerdale near Preston.

At one time the Ribble marked the northernmost extent of the ancient kingdom of Mercia. At the time of the Domesday Book, the river formed the northern boundary of an area of land (known as Inter Ripam et Mersam) that was included in the Domesday information for Cheshire, though it was probably not formally part of the county of Cheshire.

After his defeat in the Battle of Hexham in 1464 (during the Wars of the Roses), King Henry VI went into hiding at a number of houses belonging to his supporters. A little over a year later he was at Waddington Hall in Waddington. On 13 July 1465, a group of Yorkists, including the property-owner's brother, arrived at the hall to arrest him. Escaping into nearby woods, Henry was captured soon after crossing the river at the old stepping stones at Brungerley.

Geography

The Ribble begins at the confluence of the Gayle Beck and Batty Wife Beck near the viaduct at Ribblehead, in the shadow of the Yorkshire three peaks. It is the only major river rising in Yorkshire which flows westward. Its main tributaries are the Hodder and Calder which join the river near Great Mitton, the River Darwen which joins at Walton-le-Dale and the River Douglas which joins near Hesketh Bank.

Above Hellifield the valley of the river is known as Ribblesdale.

The Ribble Way is a long-distance footpath which follows the river for much of its course. The river is connected to both the Leeds and Liverpool Canal and the Lancaster Canal (via the Ribble Link). The river downstream of Preston was actively dredged when Preston was an active port; this is no longer done and silt from the river is now spreading more widely over the (sand) beaches around Fairhaven and St. Annes.

Its  estuary forms part of the Ribble and Alt Estuaries Special Protection Area for wildlife. An average of 340,000 water birds over-winter in the estuary making it the most important wetland site in Britain. The Ribble is also a key breeding ground for the endangered Atlantic salmon.

1.25 million people live in the Ribble's catchment area.

The Normal Tidal Limit (NTL) of the river is at Fishwick Bottoms, between Preston and Walton-le-Dale,  from the sea.

Since River Ribble dredging ceased, the estuary is filling up with sand and is developing a meandering path, depending on the tides and river runoff. In addition, many tributaries flow into the main channel including the Savick Brook/Ribble Link, while the River Douglas, has a significant influence both on sediment transport and hydrodynamics of the estuary.

Crossings
There was a bridge at Edisford, Clitheroe in 1339. The age of the present sandstone bridge is not known, but parts contain features indicating they may date to the late medieval period. The current Ribchester Bridge dates from 1774. It replaced one built in 1669, which also had a predecessor of unknown age.

Evidence of a bridge between Preston and Walton-le-Dale occurs in a deed in the early 13th century. A stone bridge was built in the early 1400s, possibly just west of the present Walton Bridge which was completed in 1781. Until 1755 this was the only bridge over the Ribble at Preston. The original attempt to build a bridge directly to Penwortham was completed in 1755, only to collapse the following year. The Penwortham Old Bridge opened in 1759 to replace it. In 1802 the Lancaster Canal Company completed a timber trestle bridge to facilitate a temporary tramroad to connect the two isolated sections of the canal. The missing section was never completed and, although heavily modified, the disused Old Tramroad Bridge still stands today.

Estuary crossing proposals
A Ribble estuary fixed crossing has been proposed on several occasions, to provide a quicker route between the seaside resorts of Southport and Blackpool. Two routes for a tramroad were proposed; the first in 1899 outlined a route between Crossens and Lytham, then between 1900-06 as a route from Crossens to Warton via Hesketh Bank. A railway tunnel was proposed in 1907, between Hesketh Bank and Warton. A bridge was proposed between 1938 and 1947. A road link was campaigned for in 2007, envisaging a development similar to the Rance Tidal Power Station in Brittany. In 2011, an April fools' joke suggested a  road tunnel from Marshside to Lytham St Annes.

Ribble campaigns
The River Ribble catchment is covered by the Ribble Rivers Trust, a UK based charity working to improve, protect and promote the River Ribble for both people and wildlife.

Preston City Council have published plans to build a barrage across the River Ribble, in their 'Riverworks' proposals. The aim of these proposals is to build a water sports park on a section of the Ribble, coupled with over 4,000 units of housing and businesses in the river's flood plain. Some local residents are opposing these plans, arguing that they endanger wildlife, increase flood risk to local housing and damage greenbelt areas. These residents have set up the Save The Ribble campaign.  Parts of the river are a County Biological Heritage Site.

Settlements

North Yorkshire
Horton in Ribblesdale
Stainforth
Stackhouse
Langcliffe
Giggleswick
Settle
Halton West
Nappa

Lancashire
Paythorne
Gisburn
Sawley
West Bradford
Horrocksford
Clitheroe
Great Mitton
Brockhall Village
Little Town
Ribchester
Samlesbury
Walton-le-Dale
Preston
Penwortham
Tarleton
Hundred End
Banks
Lytham

Main tributaries

River Douglas or River Asland
Savick Brook
River Darwen
Stydd Brook
Dinckley Brook
River Calder
River Hodder

Name
The River Ribble gives its name to the local government boroughs of Ribble Valley and South Ribble, and the Ribble Valley parliamentary constituency. The Ribble Bus Company once operated throughout North West England. The Ribble also lends its name to the Ribble Steam Railway.

See also
Ribchester Bridge

References

Notes

Bibliography
Crosby, A. (1996). A History of Cheshire. (The Darwen County History Series.) Chichester, West Sussex, UK: Phillimore & Co. Ltd. .
Harris, B. E., and Thacker, A. T. (1987). The Victoria History of the County of Chester. (Volume 1: Physique, Prehistory, Roman, Anglo-Saxon, and Domesday). Oxford: Oxford University Press. .
Hutton, R. (1991) The Pagan Religions of the Ancient British Isles, Oxford : Blackwell, 
Morgan, P. (1978). Domesday Book Cheshire: Including Lancashire, Cumbria, and North Wales. Chichester, Sussex: Phillimore & Co. Ltd. .
Phillips A. D. M., and Phillips, C. B. (2002),  A New Historical Atlas of Cheshire. Chester, UK: Cheshire County Council and Cheshire Community Council Publications Trust. .
Greenhalgh, M (2009). Ribble: river and valley, a local and natural history. Lancaster, Carnegie Publishing. .

Further reading

External links

Riverworks
 http://save-the-ribble.blogspot.com/
 https://www.ribbletrust.org.uk/

Rivers of North Yorkshire
Rivers of Lancashire